Hi, How Are You Daniel Johnston? is a 2015 American short documentary film about musician Daniel Johnston. The film was directed by Gabriel Sunday and executive produced by Lana Del Rey and Mac Miller. It premiered in Los Angeles at the Mama Gallery in November 2015.

Background and development
According to Billboard, the film took eight years to develop. The magazine described the motive of the film "to bring the audience inside the artist's schizophrenic head with that location acting as a cage-like home for his creative processes." The film was funded through a crowd-funding campaign on Kickstarter, with rapper Mac Miller and singer-songwriter Lana Del Rey both contributing funds to it. The duo were credited as executive producers for the film due to their $10,000 contributions. Del Rey would end up becoming more closely involved, recording a song for the soundtrack, a cover of Johnston's "Some Things Last a Long Time". The song was used in the soundtrack for the film.

The film's title derives from Johnston's self-proclaimed "unfinished album" from 1983, Hi, How Are You.

Cast
Daniel Johnston as himself
 Greg McLeod as 1983 Jeremiah The Innocent (voice)
 Myles McLeod as 2015 Jeremiah The Innocent (voice)
 Soko as Dream Laurie
 Gabriel Sunday as 1983 Daniel Johnston

Promotion and release
The film premiered at the Mama Gallery in Los Angeles on November 7, 2015. The film premiered on the internet on November 11 and went on a film festival run in 2016, gaining the Bohemian Rhapsody Award for Sunday at the Sydney Underground Film Festival and an Honorable Mention as an Anarchy Short at the Slamdance Film Festival

The film's credits cite Lana Del Rey, Larry Janss, Daniel Johnston, Dick Johnston, David Lee Miller, Mac Miller, and Barrie-James O'Neill as executive producers, with Sarah Rivka, Matt Roznovak, Tomas Seidita, Ben Speigelman, Erica Sterne, Jason Suhrke, and Gabriel Sunday as producers.

References

External links
 Official Website
 

2015 films
American short documentary films
Documentary films about rock music and musicians
Daniel Johnston
Kickstarter-funded documentaries
Lana Del Rey
2010s English-language films
2010s American films
2015 short documentary films